The Lamond-Riggs/Lillian J. Huff Neighborhood Library is a branch of the District of Columbia Public Library in the Queens Chapel neighborhood of Washington, D.C. It is located at 5401 South Dakota Avenue NE. Residents had requested a library for the area as early as 1957; the current building opened in 1983 at a cost of $2 million.

In the late 2010s, the city approved a $20 million project to rebuild the library, designed by Hammel, Green and Abrahamson. Razing of the building began on January 4, 2021, and construction is ongoing as of that month, with completion slated for spring 2022.

The library was renamed the Lamond-Riggs/Lillian J. Huff Library in 2022 to honor the legacy of activist and organizer Lillian J. Huff.

References

External links 

 Official website

Public libraries in Washington, D.C.